Oenothera tetraptera, known as fourwing evening primrose, is a species of flowering plant in the evening primrose family (Onagraceae) native to the Americas. It has widely naturalized in other areas, including southern Africa, Europe, Asia, and Oceania.

Oenothera tetraptera was first formally named by Spanish botanist Antonio José Cavanilles in 1796. The four-petaled, white flowers open around sunset. The fruit is a hairy, obovoid capsule, 7–18 mm in length with wings 2–3 mm wide on the valves, for which the species was named.

References

tetraptera
Flora of North America
Flora of South America
Plants described in 1796
Taxa named by Antonio José Cavanilles